The New Policy Institute, often shortened to just NPI, is a British think tank based in London. It was established in 1996, and focusses on social and economic issues from a progressive perspective.

History

The New Policy Institute was founded in 1996 with a mission of ‘advancing social justice in a market economy.  It conducts research and consultancy work on poverty, welfare reform, labour markets, and macroeconomics. The New Policy Institute is independent and describes its work as being grounded primarily in data analysis, though it also conducts data collection and qualitative research.

The think tank is noted for its close relationship with the Joseph Rowntree Foundation, NPI having produced poverty profiles and quantitative assessments for the Foundation.

Recent Work

The New Policy Institute produces regular monitoring reports on poverty and social exclusion for the Joseph Rowntree Foundation and for the Trust for London. It has also produced research on the state of the water industry, commissioned by the trade union UNISON which used it to call for a national inquiry into the industry.

In 2018, The New Policy institute and Trust for London carried out a joint study which found that the London Borough of Harrow has one of the poorest records on affordable housing. The study found that Harrow had had a reduction of 102 affordable homes since 2013, with many demolished or converted into other forms of accommodation.

See also 

 List of think tanks in the United Kingdom

References

Political and economic think tanks based in the United Kingdom
Think tanks established in 1996